Yacouba Doumbia (born 11 April 1997) is a Malian footballer who plays as a defender for the Mali national team.

International career
Doumbia made his professional debut with the Mali national team in a 1–0 2020 African Nations Championship win over Burkina Faso on 16 January 2021.

References

External links
 
 

1992 births
Living people
Sportspeople from Bamako
Malian footballers
Mali international footballers
Association football defenders
CO de Bamako players
Stade Malien players
Malian Première Division players
Malian expatriate sportspeople in Algeria
JS Kabylie players
Expatriate footballers in Algeria
Malian expatriate footballers
Mali A' international footballers
2020 African Nations Championship players